Kid Butler could refer to:

Kid Butler (outfielder), (1861-1921), 19th century baseball outfielder for the 1884 Boston Reds
Kid Butler (infielder), (1887-1964), baseball infielder for the 1907 St. Louis Browns